After the Morning  is the third solo album from folk artist Cara Dillon. It was recorded at their home studio in Frome, Somerset, Mayfair Studios, Kore Studios, Amberville Studios and Sun Street Studios. The strings and brass were recorded in Prague. Similar to her previous albums, After the Morning was produced by Sam Lakeman, her husband and musical partner. Additional production was by Mike 'Spike' Drake, who also mixed the album. It features the singles "Never in a Million Years", and the double A-side of "I Wish You Well" and "This Time".

The lead single, "Never in a Million Years", was a fairly successful radio hit given the folk music genre with which Dillon is associated. It spent six weeks on the BBC Radio 2 playlist, as well as the RTÉ Radio 1 playlist, and was Record of the Week on BBC Radio Ulster. Due to a lack interest on the part of the record label (Rough Trade), the second single, "This Time/I Wish You Well" was cancelled. "This Time" was remixed with additional vocals, electric guitar and percussion for the single. The release date of the double A-side single was originally 31 July 2006, to coincide with Cambridge Folk Festival where Dillon was to perform, but was changed to 14 August 2006 before being cancelled.

Track listing
 "Never in a Million Years" (Cara Dillon, Sam Lakeman) – 3:49
 "I Wish You Well" (Dillon, Lakeman) 4:19
 "Here's a Health" (Dillon, Lakeman) – 4:46
 "Brockagh Braes" (Traditional) – 5:11
 "Garden Valley" (Dougie MacLean) – 4:08
 "October Winds" (Dillon, Lakeman) – 4:02
 "Bold Jamie" (Dillon, Lakeman) – 5:00
 "The Streets of Derry" (Traditional) – 4:27
 "This Time" (Dillon, Lakeman, Katie Marne, Chuck Norman) – 3:59
 "The Snows They Melt the Soonest" (Traditional) – 4:18
 "Walls" (Mary Ann Kennedy, Pamela Rose, Randy Sharp) – 3:02
 "Grace" (Dillon, Lakeman) – 3:15

Personnel
 Paul Brady – vocals
 Cara Dillon – arranger, vocals
 Mary Dillon – backing vocals
 Roy Dodds – percussion
 Spike Drake – producer, mixing
 Frank Gallagher – string arrangements
 Cathal Hayden – fiddle
 Sam Lakeman – Producer, Piano, acoustic guitar, organ, percussion
 Simon Lea – drums
 Neill MacColl – guitar, mandolin
 Ben Nicholls – upright bass
 Martin O'Connor – button accordion
 Doug Sax – mastering
 Martin Simpson – guitar

Chart performance

Notes and references

Cara Dillon albums
2006 albums
Blanco y Negro Records albums